Analía Hirmbruchner (born 10 January 1989) is an Argentine retired footballer who played as a midfielder. She was a member of the Argentina women's national team.

Club career
Hirmbruchner played for River Plate, Independiente and UAI Urquiza. She retired in 2013 at age 24.

International career
Hirmbruchner represented Argentina at the 2006 FIFA U-20 Women's World Cup. At senior level, she played two South American Women's Football Championship editions (2006 and 2010).

International goals
Scores and results list Argentina's goal tally first

References

1989 births
Living people
Women's association football midfielders
Argentine women's footballers
Sportspeople from Buenos Aires Province
People from San Martín, Buenos Aires
Argentina women's international footballers
Club Atlético River Plate (women) players
Independiente (women) players
UAI Urquiza (women) players